Vedanta, also known as Uttara Mīmāṃsā, is a Hindu philosophical tradition that is considered one of the six orthodox (āstika) schools of Hindu philosophy. The word "Vedanta" means "end of the Vedas", and encompasses the ideas and philosophies present in the Upanishads, with a focus on knowledge and liberation. Vedanta developed into many sub-traditions, all of which base their ideas on the authority of a common group of texts called the Prasthānatrayī , translated as "the three sources": the Upanishads, the Brahma Sutras and the Bhagavad Gita. 

All Vedanta traditions contain extensive discussions on ontology, soteriology and epistemology, even as there is much disagreement among the various schools. Independently considered, they may seem completely disparate due to the pronounced differences in thoughts and reasoning. 

The main traditions of Vedanta are: Advaita (non-dualism), Bhedabheda (difference and non-difference), Vishishtadvaita (qualified non-dualism), Tattvavada (Dvaita) (dualism), and Suddhadvaita (pure non-dualism). Modern developments in Vedanta include Neo-Vedanta, and the philosophy of the Swaminarayan Sampradaya.  

Most major Vedanta schools, except Advaita Vedanta and Neo-Vedanta, are related to Vaishnavism and emphasize devotion (Bhakti Yoga) to God, understood as being Vishnu or a related manifestation. Advaita Vedanta, on the other hand, emphasizes Jñana (knowledge) and Jñana Yoga over theistic devotion. While the monism of Advaita has attracted considerable attention in the West due to the influence of modern Hindus like Swami Vivekananda and Ramana Maharshi, most of the other Vedanta traditions focus on Vaishnava theology.

Etymology and nomenclature
The word Vedanta is made of two words :
 Veda (वेद) - refers to the four sacred vedic texts.
 Anta (अंत) - this word means "End".

The word Vedanta literally means the end of the Vedas and originally referred to the Upanishads. The meaning of Vedanta expanded later to encompass the different philosophical traditions that are based on to the Prasthanatrayi.

According to scholars, the Upanishads may be regarded as the end of Vedas in different senses:
 They were the last literary products of the Vedic period.
 They represent the pinnacle of Vedic philosophy.
 They were taught and debated last, in the Brahmacharya (student) stage.

Vedanta is one of the six orthodox (āstika) schools of Indian philosophy. It is also called Uttara Mīmāṃsā, which means the 'latter enquiry' or 'higher enquiry'; and is often contrasted with Pūrva Mīmāṃsā, the 'former enquiry' or 'primary enquiry'. Pūrva Mīmāṃsā deals with the karmakāṇḍa or ritualistic section (the Samhita and Brahmanas) in the Vedas while Uttara Mīmāṃsā concerns itself with the deeper questions of existence and meaning.

Vedanta philosophy

Common features
Despite their differences, all schools of Vedanta share some common features:
 Vedanta is the pursuit of knowledge into the Brahman and the Ātman.
 The Upaniṣads, the Bhagavadgītā and the Brahma Sūtras constitute the basis of Vedanta (known as the three canonical sources).
 Scripture (Sruti Śabda) is main reliable source of knowledge (pramana).
 Brahman - Ishvara (God), exists as the unchanging material cause and instrumental cause of the world. The only exception here is that Dvaita Vedanta does not hold Brahman to be the material cause, but only the efficient cause.
 The self (Ātman or Jiva) is the agent of its own acts (karma) and the recipient of the consequences of these actions.
 Belief in rebirth (samsara) and the desirability of release from the cycle of rebirths (moksha).
 Rejection of Buddhism and Jainism and conclusions of the other Vedic schools (Nyaya, Vaisheshika, Samkhya, Yoga, and, to some extent, the Purva Mimamsa).

Scripture 
The main Upaniṣhads, the Bhagavadgītā and the Brahma Sūtras are the foundational scriptures in Vedanta. All schools of Vedanta propound their philosophy by interpreting these texts, collectively called the Prasthānatrayī, literally, three sources. 

 The Upaniṣads, or Śruti prasthāna; considered the Sruti, the "heard" (and repeated) foundation of Vedanta.
 The Brahma Sūtras, or Nyaya prasthana / Yukti prasthana; considered the reason-based foundation of Vedanta.
 The Bhagavadgītā, or Smriti prasthāna; considered the Smriti (remembered tradition) foundation of Vedanta.

All prominent Vedantic teachers, including Shankara, Bhaskara, Ramanuja, Madhva, Nimbarka, and Vallabha wrote commentaries on these three sources. The Brahma Sūtras of Badarayana serve as a synthesis of the teachings found in the diverse Upaniṣads, and while there may have been other similar syntheses in the past, only the Brahma Sūtras have survived to the present day. The Bhagavadgītā, with its syncretism of Samkhya, Yoga, and Upanishadic thought, has also been a significant influence on Vedantic thought.

All Vedāntins agree that scripture (śruti) is the only means of knowing (pramāṇa) regarding spiritual matters (which are beyond perception and inference). This is explained by Rāmānuja as follows:A theory that rests exclusively on human concepts may at some other time or place be refuted by arguments devised by cleverer people.... The conclusion is that with regard to supernatural matters, Scripture alone is the epistemic authority and that reasoning is to be used only in support of Scripture’ [Śrī Bhāṣya 2.1.12].For specific sub-schools of Vedanta, other texts may be equally important. For example, for Advaita Vedanta, the works of Adi Shankara are central. For the Theistic Vaishnava schools of Vedanta, the Bhāgavata Purāṇa is particularly important. The Bhāgavata Purāṇa is one of the most widely commented upon works in Vedanta. This text is so central to the Krishna centered Vedanta schools that the Vedantin theologian Vallabha added the Bhāgavata Purāṇa as a fourth text to the praṣṭhāna traya (three classic scriptures of Vedanta).

Metaphysics
Vedanta philosophies discuss three fundamental metaphysical categories and the relations between the three.
 Brahman or Ishvara: the ultimate reality
 Ātman or Jivātman: the individual soul, self
 Prakriti/Jagat: the empirical world, ever-changing physical universe, body and matter

Brahman / Ishvara – Conceptions of the Supreme Reality 
Shankara, in formulating Advaita, talks of two conceptions of Brahman: The higher Brahman as undifferentiated Being, and a lower Brahman endowed with qualities as the creator of the universe.
 Parā or Higher Brahman:  The undifferentiated, absolute, infinite, transcendental, supra-relational Brahman beyond all thought and speech is defined as parā Brahman, nirviśeṣa Brahman or nirguṇa Brahman and is the Absolute of metaphysics.
 Aparā or Lower Brahman: The Brahman with qualities defined as aparā Brahman or saguṇa Brahman. The saguṇa Brahman is endowed with attributes and represents the personal God of religion.

Ramanuja, in formulating Vishishtadvaita Vedanta, rejects Nirguṇa – that the undifferentiated Absolute is inconceivable – and adopts a theistic interpretation of the Upanishads, accepts Brahman as Ishvara, the personal God who is the seat of all auspicious attributes, as the One reality. The God of Vishishtadvaita is accessible to the devotee, yet remains the Absolute, with differentiated attributes.

Madhva, in expounding Dvaita philosophy, maintains that Vishnu is the supreme God, thus identifying the Brahman, or absolute reality, of the Upanishads with a personal god, as Ramanuja had done before him. Nimbarka, in his dvaitadvata philosophy, accepted the Brahman both as nirguṇa and as saguṇa. Vallabha, in his shuddhadvaita philosophy, not only accepts the triple ontological essence of the Brahman, but also His manifestation as personal God (Ishvara), as matter and as individual souls.

Relation between Brahman and Jiva / Atman 
The schools of Vedanta differ in their conception of the relation they see between Ātman / Jivātman and Brahman / Ishvara:
 According to Advaita Vedanta, Ātman is identical with Brahman and there is no difference.
 According to Vishishtadvaita, Jīvātman is different from Ishvara, though eternally connected with Him as His mode. The oneness of the Supreme Reality is understood in the sense of an organic unity (vishistaikya). Brahman/Ishvara alone, as organically related to all Jīvātman and the material universe is the one Ultimate Reality.
 According to Dvaita, the Jīvātman is totally and always different from Brahman / Ishvara.
 According to Shuddhadvaita (pure monism), the Jīvātman and Brahman are identical; both, along with the changing empirically observed universe being Krishna.

Epistemology

Pramana 
Pramāṇa (Sanskrit: प्रमाण) literally means "proof", "that which is the means of valid knowledge". It refers to epistemology in Indian philosophies, and encompasses the study of reliable and valid means by which human beings gain accurate, true knowledge. The focus of Pramana is the manner in which correct knowledge can be acquired, how one knows or does not know, and to what extent knowledge pertinent about someone or something can be acquired. Ancient and medieval Indian texts identify six pramanas as correct means of accurate knowledge and truths:
 Pratyakṣa (perception)
 Anumāṇa (inference)
 Upamāṇa (comparison and analogy)
 Arthāpatti (postulation, derivation from circumstances)
 Anupalabdi (non-perception, negative/cognitive proof)
 Śabda (scriptural testimony/ verbal testimony of past or present reliable experts).
The different schools of Vedanta have historically disagreed as to which of the six are epistemologically valid. For example, while Advaita Vedanta accepts all six pramanas, Vishishtadvaita and Dvaita accept only three pramanas (perception, inference and testimony).

Advaita considers Pratyakṣa (perception) as the most reliable source of knowledge, and Śabda, the scriptural evidence, is considered secondary except for matters related to Brahman, where it is the only evidence. In Vishistadvaita and Dvaita, Śabda, the scriptural testimony, is considered the most authentic means of knowledge instead.

Theories of cause and effect 
All schools of Vedanta subscribe to the theory of Satkāryavāda, which means that the effect is pre-existent in the cause. But there are two different views on the status of the "effect", that is, the world. Most schools of Vedanta, as well as Samkhya, support Parinamavada, the idea that the world is a real transformation (parinama) of Brahman. In contrast to Badarayana, Adi Shankara and Advaita Vedantists hold a different view, Vivartavada, which says that the effect, the world, is merely an unreal (vivarta) transformation of its cause, Brahman.

Overview of the main schools of Vedanta
The Upanishads present an associative philosophical inquiry in the form of identifying various doctrines and then presenting arguments for or against them. They form the basic texts and Vedanta interprets them through rigorous philosophical exegesis to defend the point of view of their specific sampradaya. Varying interpretations of the Upanishads and their synthesis, the Brahma Sutras, led to the development of different schools of Vedanta over time.

Vinayak Sakaram Ghate of Bhandarkar Oriental Research Institute conducted a comprehensive comparative analysis of the Brahma Sutra commentaries by Nimbarka, Ramanuja, Vallabha, Shankara and Madhva. In his conclusion, Ghate determined that Nimbarka's and Ramanuja's commentaries provide the most accurate interpretation of the Brahma Sutras, considering both the passages that emphasize unity and those that emphasize diversity. Gavin Flood suggests that although Advaita Vedanta is the most well-known school of Vedanta and is sometimes wrongly perceived as the sole representation of Vedantic thought, with Shankara being a follower of Saivism, the true essence of Vedanta lies within the Vaisnava tradition and can be considered a discourse within the broad framework of Vaisnavism. 

In the Vaishnava traditions, four sampradays are considered to be of special significance, while the number of prominent Vedanta schools varies among scholars, with some classifying them as three to six.
 Bhedabheda, as early as the 7th century CE, or even the 4th century CE. 
 Dvaitādvaita or Svabhavikabhedabheda (Vaishnava), founded by Nimbarka in the 7th century CE
 Achintya Bheda Abheda (Vaishnava), founded by Chaitanya Mahaprabhu (1486–1534 CE), propagated by Gaudiya Vaishnava
 Advaita (monistic), many scholars of which most prominent are Gaudapada (~500 CE) and Adi Shankaracharya (8th century CE)
 Vishishtadvaita (Vaishnava), prominent scholars are Nathamuni, Yāmuna and Ramanuja (1017–1137 CE)
 Akshar-Purushottam Darshan, based on the teachings of Swaminarayan (1781-1830 CE) and rooted in Ramanuja's Vishishtadvaita; propagated most notably by BAPS
 Tattvavada (Dvaita) (Vaishnava), founded by Madhvacharya (1199–1278 CE). The prominent scholars are Jayatirtha (1345-1388 CE), and Vyasatirtha (1460–1539 CE)
 Suddhadvaita (Vaishnava), founded by Vallabha (1479–1531 CE)

Bhedabheda Vedanta  (difference and non-difference)

Bhedābheda means "difference and non-difference" and is more a tradition than a school of Vedanta. The schools of this tradition emphasize that the individual self (Jīvatman) is both different and not different from Brahman. Notable figures in this school are Bhartriprapancha, Nimbārka (7th century) who founded the Dvaitadvaita school, Bhāskara (8th–9th century), Ramanuja's teacher Yādavaprakāśa, Chaitanya (1486–1534) who founded the Achintya Bheda Abheda school, and Vijñānabhikṣu (16th century).

Dvaitādvaita Vedanta

Nimbārka (7th century) sometimes identified with Bhāskara, propounded Dvaitādvaita. Brahman (God), souls (chit) and matter or the universe (achit) are considered as three equally real and co-eternal realities. Brahman is the controller (niyanta), the soul is the enjoyer (bhokta), and the material universe is the object enjoyed (bhogya). The Brahman is Krishna, the ultimate cause who is omniscient, omnipotent, all-pervading Being. He is the efficient cause of the universe because, as Lord of Karma and internal ruler of souls, He brings about creation so that the souls can reap the consequences of their karma. God is considered to be the material cause of the universe because creation was a manifestation of His powers of soul (chit) and matter (achit); creation is a transformation (parinama) of God's powers. He can be realized only through a constant effort to merge oneself with His nature through meditation and devotion.

Achintya-Bheda-Abheda Vedanta

Chaitanya Mahaprabhu (1486 – 1533) was the prime exponent of Achintya-Bheda-Abheda. In Sanskrit achintya means 'inconceivable'. Achintya-Bheda-Abheda represents the philosophy of "inconceivable difference in non-difference", in relation to the non-dual reality of Brahman-Atman which it calls (Krishna), svayam bhagavan. The notion of "inconceivability" (acintyatva) is used to reconcile apparently contradictory notions in Upanishadic teachings. This school asserts that Krishna is Bhagavan of the bhakti yogins, the Brahman of the jnana yogins, and has a divine potency that is inconceivable. He is all-pervading and thus in all parts of the universe (non-difference), yet he is inconceivably more (difference). This school is at the foundation of the Gaudiya Vaishnava religious tradition. The ISKCON or the Hare Krishnas also affiliate to this school of Vedanta Philosophy.

Advaita Vedanta (non-dualism)

Advaita Vedanta (IAST ; Sanskrit: अद्वैत वेदान्त), propounded by Gaudapada (7th century) and Adi Shankara (8th century), espouses non-dualism and monism. Brahman is held to be the sole unchanging metaphysical reality and identical to the individual Atman. The physical world, on the other hand, is always-changing empirical Maya. The absolute and infinite Atman-Brahman is realized by a process of negating everything relative, finite, empirical and changing.

The school accepts no duality, no limited individual souls (Atman / Jivatman), and no separate unlimited cosmic soul. All souls and their existence across space and time are considered to be the same oneness.  Spiritual liberation in Advaita is the full comprehension and realization of oneness, that one's unchanging Atman (soul) is the same as the Atman in everyone else, as well as being identical to Brahman.

Vishishtadvaita Vedanta (qualified non-dualism)

Vishishtadvaita, propounded by Ramanuja (11–12th century), asserts that Jivatman (human souls) and Brahman (as Vishnu) are different, a difference that is never transcended. With this qualification, Ramanuja also affirmed monism by saying that there is unity of all souls and that the individual soul has the potential to realize identity with the Brahman. Vishishtadvaita, like Advaita, is a non-dualistic school of Vedanta in a qualified way, and both begin by assuming that all souls can hope for and achieve the state of blissful liberation. On the relation between the Brahman and the world of matter (Prakriti), Vishishtadvaita states both are two different absolutes, both metaphysically true and real, neither is false or illusive, and that saguna Brahman with attributes is also real. Ramanuja states that God, like man, has both soul and body, and the world of matter is the glory of God's body. The path to Brahman (Vishnu), according to Ramanuja, is devotion to godliness and constant remembrance of the beauty and love of the personal god (bhakti of saguna Brahman).

Swaminarayan Darshana 

The Swaminarayan Darshana, also called Akshar Purushottam Darshan by the BAPS, was propounded by Swaminarayan (1781-1830 CE) and is rooted in Ramanuja's Vishishtadvaita. It asserts that Parabrahman (Purushottam, Narayana) and Aksharbrahman are two distinct eternal realities. Adherents believe that they can achieve moksha, or freedom from the cycle of birth and death, by becoming aksharrup (or brahmarup), that is, by attaining qualities similar to Akshar (or Aksharbrahman) and worshipping Purushottam (or Parabrahman; the supreme living entity; God).

Tattvavada Vedanta (Dvaita)(dualism)

Tattvavada, propounded by Madhvacharya (13th century), is based on the premise of realism or realistic point of view. The term Dvaita which means dualism was later applied to Madhvacharya's philosophy. Atman (soul) and Brahman (as Vishnu) are understood as two completely different entities. Brahman is the creator of the universe, perfect in knowledge, perfect in knowing, perfect in its power, and distinct from souls, distinct from matter.  In Dvaita Vedanta, an individual soul must feel attraction, love, attachment and complete devotional surrender to Vishnu for salvation, and it is only His grace that leads to redemption and salvation. Madhva believed that some souls are eternally doomed and damned, a view not found in Advaita and Vishishtadvaita Vedanta. While the Vishishtadvaita Vedanta asserted "qualitative monism and quantitative pluralism of souls", Madhva asserted both "qualitative and quantitative pluralism of souls".

Shuddhādvaita Vedanta (pure nondualism)

Shuddhadvaita (pure non-dualism), propounded by Vallabhacharya (1479–1531 CE), states that the entire universe is real and is subtly Brahman only in the form of Krishna. Vallabhacharya agreed with Advaita Vedanta's ontology, but emphasized that prakriti (empirical world, body) is not separate from the Brahman, but just another manifestation of the latter. Everything, everyone, everywhere – soul and body, living and non-living, jiva and matter – is the eternal Krishna. The way to Krishna, in this school, is bhakti. Vallabha opposed renunciation of monistic sannyasa as ineffective and advocates the path of devotion (bhakti) rather than knowledge (jnana). The goal of bhakti is to turn away from ego, self-centered-ness and deception, and to turn towards the eternal Krishna in everything continually offering freedom from samsara.

History
The history of Vedanta can be divided into two periods: one prior to the composition of the Brahma Sutras and the other encompassing the schools that developed after the Brahma Sutras were written. Until the 11th century, Vedanta was a peripheral school of thought.

Before the Brahma Sutras (before the 5th century)
Little is known of schools of Vedanta existing before the composition of the Brahma Sutras (400–450 CE). It is clear that Badarayana, the writer of Brahma Sutras, was not the first person to systematize the teachings of the Upanishads, as he quotes six Vedantic teachers before him – Ashmarathya, Badari, Audulomi, Kashakrtsna, Karsnajini and Atreya. References to other early Vedanta teachers – Brahmadatta, Sundara, Pandaya, Tanka and Dravidacharya – are found in secondary literature of later periods. The works of these ancient teachers have not survived, but based on the quotes attributed to them in later literature, Sharma postulates that Ashmarathya and Audulomi were Bhedabheda scholars, Kashakrtsna and Brahmadatta were Advaita scholars, while Tanka and Dravidacharya were either Advaita or Vishistadvaita scholars.

Brahma Sutras (completed in the 5th century)

Badarayana summarized and  interpreted teachings of the Upanishads in the Brahma Sutras, also called the Vedanta Sutra, possibly "written from a Bhedābheda Vedāntic viewpoint." Badarayana summarized the teachings of the classical Upanishads and refuted the rival philosophical schools in ancient India. The Brahma Sutras laid the basis for the development of Vedanta philosophy.

Though attributed to Badarayana, the Brahma Sutras were likely composed by multiple authors over the course of hundreds of years. The estimates on when the Brahma Sutras were complete vary, with Nakamura in 1989 and Nicholson in his 2013 review stating, that they were most likely compiled in the present form around 400–450 CE. Isaeva suggests they were complete and in current form by 200 CE, while Nakamura states that "the great part of the Sutra must have been in existence much earlier than that" (800 - 500 BCE).

The book is composed of four chapters, each divided into four-quarters or sections. These sutras attempt to synthesize the diverse teachings of the Upanishads. However, the cryptic nature of aphorisms of the Brahma Sutras have required exegetical commentaries. These commentaries have resulted in the formation of numerous Vedanta schools, each interpreting the texts in its own way and producing its own commentary.

Between the Brahma Sutras and Adi Shankara (5th–8th centuries)

Little with specificity is known of the period between the Brahma Sutras (5th century CE) and Adi Shankara (8th century CE). Only two writings of this period have survived: the Vākyapadīya, written by Bhartṛhari (second half 5th century,) and the Kārikā written by Gaudapada (early 6th or 7th century CE).

Shankara mentions 99 different predecessors of his school in his commentaries. A number of important early Vedanta thinkers have been listed in the Siddhitraya by Yamunācārya (c. 1050), the Vedārthasamgraha by Rāmānuja (c. 1050–1157), and the Yatīndramatadīpikā by Śrīnivāsa Dāsa. At least fourteen thinkers are known to have existed between the composition of the Brahma Sutras and Shankara's lifetime.

A noted scholar of this period was Bhartriprapancha. Bhartriprapancha maintained that the Brahman is one and there is unity, but that this unity has varieties. Scholars see Bhartriprapancha as an early philosopher in the line who teach the tenet of Bhedabheda.

Gaudapada, Adi Shankara (Advaita Vedanta) (6th–9th centuries)

Influenced by Buddhism, Advaita vedanta departs from the bhedabheda-philosophy, instead postulating the identity of Atman with the Whole (Brahman),

Gaudapada
Gaudapada (c. 6th century CE), was the teacher or a more distant predecessor of Govindapada, the teacher of Adi Shankara. Shankara is widely considered as the apostle of Advaita Vedanta.

Gaudapada's  relied on the Mandukya, Brihadaranyaka and Chhandogya Upanishads. Scholars are divided on a possible influence of Buddhism on Gaudapada's philosophy. The fact that Shankara, in addition to the Brahma Sutras, the principal Upanishads and the Bhagvad Gita, wrote an independent commentary on the  proves its importance in  literature.

Adi Shankara
The Mandukya Upanishad and the  have been described by Shankara as containing "the epitome of the substance of the import of Vedanta". It was Shankara who integrated Gaudapada work with the ancient Brahma Sutras, "and give it a locus classicus" alongside the realistic strain of the Brahma Sutras. 

A noted contemporary of Shankara was Maṇḍana Miśra, who regarded Mimamsa and Vedanta as forming a single system and advocated their combination known as Karma-jnana-samuchchaya-vada. The treatise on the differences between the Vedanta school and the Mimamsa school was a contribution of Adi Shankara. Advaita Vedanta rejects rituals in favor of renunciation, for example.

Early Vaishnavism Vedanta (7th–9th centuries)
Early Vaishnava Vedanta retains the tradition of bhedabheda, equating Brahman with Vishnu or Krishna.

Nimbārka and Dvaitādvaita

Nimbārka (7th century) sometimes identified with Bhāskara, propounded Dvaitādvaita or Bhedābheda.

Bhāskara and Upadhika
Bhāskara (8th–9th century) also taught Bhedabheda. In postulating Upadhika, he considers both identity and difference to be equally real. As the causal principle, Brahman is considered non-dual and formless pure being and intelligence. The same Brahman, manifest as events, becomes the world of plurality.  is Brahman limited by the mind. Matter and its limitations are considered real, not a manifestation of ignorance. Bhaskara advocated bhakti as dhyana (meditation) directed toward the transcendental Brahman. He refuted the idea of Maya and denied the possibility of liberation in bodily existence.

Vaishnavism Bhakti Vedanta (11th–16th centuries)

The Bhakti movement of late medieval Hinduism started in the 7th century, but rapidly expanded after the 12th century. It was supported by the Puranic literature such as the Bhagavata Purana, poetic works, as well as many scholarly bhasyas and samhitas.

This period saw the growth of Vashnavism Sampradayas (denominations or communities) under the influence of scholars such as Ramanujacharya, Vedanta Desika, Madhvacharya and Vallabhacharya. Bhakti poets or teachers such as Manavala Mamunigal, Namdev, Ramananda, Surdas, Tulsidas, Eknath, Tyagaraja, Chaitanya Mahaprabhu and many others influenced the expansion of Vaishnavism. These Vaishnavism sampradaya founders challenged the then dominant Shankara's doctrines of Advaita Vedanta, particularly Ramanuja in the 12th century, Vedanta Desika and Madhva in the 13th, building their theology on the devotional tradition of the Alvars (Shri Vaishnavas), and Vallabhacharya in the 16th century.

In North and Eastern India, Vaishnavism gave rise to various late Medieval movements: Ramananda in the 14th century, Sankaradeva in the 15th and Vallabha and Chaitanya in the 16th century.

Ramanuja (Vishishtadvaita Vedanta) (11th–12th centuries)
Rāmānuja (1017–1137 CE) was the most influential philosopher in the Vishishtadvaita tradition. As the philosophical architect of Vishishtadvaita, he taught qualified non-dualism. Ramanuja's teacher, Yadava Prakasha, followed the Advaita monastic tradition. Tradition has it that Ramanuja disagreed with Yadava and Advaita Vedanta, and instead followed Nathamuni and Yāmuna. Ramanuja reconciled the Prasthanatrayi with the theism and philosophy of the Vaishnava Alvars poet-saints. Ramanuja wrote a number of influential texts, such as a bhasya on the Brahma Sutras and the Bhagavad Gita, all in Sanskrit.

Ramanuja presented the epistemological and soteriological importance of bhakti, or the devotion to a personal God (Vishnu in Ramanuja's case) as a means to spiritual liberation. His theories assert that there exists a plurality and distinction between Atman (souls) and Brahman (metaphysical, ultimate reality), while he also affirmed that there is unity of all souls and that the individual soul has the potential to realize identity with the Brahman. Vishishtadvaiata provides the philosophical basis of Sri Vaishnavism.

Ramanuja was influential in integrating Bhakti, the devotional worship, into Vedanta premises.

Madhva (Tattvavada or Dvaita Vedanta)(13th–14th centuries) 
Tattvavada or Dvaita Vedanta was propounded by Madhvacharya (1238–1317 CE). He presented the opposite interpretation of Shankara in his Dvaita, or dualistic system. In contrast to Shankara's non-dualism and Ramanuja's qualified non-dualism, he championed unqualified dualism. Madhva wrote commentaries on the chief Upanishads, the Bhagavad Gita and the Brahma Sutra.

Madhva started his Vedic studies at age seven, joined an Advaita Vedanta monastery in Dwarka (Gujarat), studied under guru Achyutrapreksha, frequently disagreed with him, left the Advaita monastery, and founded Dvaita. Madhva and his followers Jayatirtha and Vyasatirtha, were critical of all competing Hindu philosophies, Jainism and Buddhism, but particularly intense in their criticism of Advaita Vedanta and Adi Shankara.

Dvaita Vedanta is theistic and it identifies Brahman with Narayana, or more specifically Vishnu, in a manner similar to Ramanuja's Vishishtadvaita Vedanta. But it is more explicitly pluralistic. Madhva's emphasis for difference between soul and Brahman was so pronounced that he taught there were differences (1) between material things; (2) between material things and souls; (3) between material things and God; (4) between souls; and (5) between souls and God. He also advocated for a difference in degrees in the possession of knowledge. He also advocated for differences in the enjoyment of bliss even in the case of liberated souls, a doctrine found in no other system of Indian philosophy.

Chaitanya Mahaprabhu (Achintya Bheda Abheda) (16th century)

Achintya Bheda Abheda (Vaishnava), founded by Chaitanya Mahaprabhu (1486–1534 CE), was propagated by Gaudiya Vaishnava. Historically, it was Chaitanya Mahaprabhu who founded congregational chanting of holy names of Krishna in the early 16th century after becoming a sannyasi.

Modern times (19th century – present)

Swaminarayan and Akshar-Purushottam Darshan (19th century) 
The Swaminarayan Darshana, which is rooted in Ramanuja's Vishishtadvaita, was founded in 1801 by Swaminarayan (1781-1830 CE), and is contemporarily most notably propagated by BAPS. Due to the commentarial work of Bhadreshdas Swami, the Akshar-Purushottam teachings were recognized as a distinct school of Vedanta by the Shri Kashi Vidvat Parishad in 2017 and by members of the 17th World Sanskrit Conference in 2018. Swami Paramtattvadas describes the Akshar-Purushottam teachings as "a distinct school of thought within the larger expanse of classical Vedanta," presenting the Akshar-Purushottam teachings as a seventh school of Vedanta.

Neo-Vedanta (19th century)

Neo-Vedanta, variously called as "Hindu modernism", "neo-Hinduism", and "neo-Advaita", is a term that denotes some novel interpretations of Hinduism that developed in the 19th century, presumably as a reaction to the colonial British rule.  writes that these notions accorded the Hindu nationalists an opportunity to attempt the construction of a nationalist ideology to help unite the Hindus to fight colonial oppression. Western orientalists, in their search for its "essence", attempted to formulate a notion of "Hinduism" based on a single interpretation of Vedanta as a unified body of religious praxis. This was contra-factual as, historically, Hinduism and Vedanta had always accepted a diversity of traditions.  asserts that the neo-Vedantic theory of "overarching tolerance and acceptance" was used by the Hindu reformers, together with the ideas of Universalism and Perennialism, to challenge the polemic dogmatism of Judaeo-Christian-Islamic missionaries against the Hindus.

The neo-Vedantins argued that the six orthodox schools of Hindu philosophy were perspectives on a single truth, all valid and complementary to each other.   sees these interpretations as incorporating western ideas into traditional systems, especially Advaita Vedanta. It is the modern form of Advaita Vedanta, states , the neo-Vedantists subsumed the Buddhist philosophies as part of the Vedanta tradition and then argued that all the world religions are same "non-dualistic position as the philosophia perennis", ignoring the differences within and outside of Hinduism.

A major proponent in the popularization of this Universalist and Perennialist interpretation of Advaita Vedanta was Vivekananda, who played a major role in the revival of Hinduism. He was also instrumental in the spread of Advaita Vedanta to the West via the Vedanta Society, the international arm of the Ramakrishna Order.

Criticism of Neo-Vedanta label 
 writes that the attempts at integration which came to be known as neo-Vedanta were evident as early as between the 12th and the 16th century−  

Matilal criticizes Neo-Hinduism as an oddity developed by West-inspired Western Indologists and attributes it to the flawed Western perception of Hinduism in modern India. In his scathing criticism of this school of reasoning,  says:

Influence

Frithjof Schuon summarizes the influence of Vedanta on Hinduism as follows:

Gavin Flood states,

Hindu traditions 
Vedanta, adopting ideas from other orthodox (āstika) schools, became the most prominent school of Hinduism. Vedanta traditions led to the development of many traditions in Hinduism. Sri Vaishnavism of south and southeastern India is based on Ramanuja's Vishishtadvaita Vedanta. Ramananda led to the Vaishnav Bhakti Movement in north, east, central and west India. This movement draws its philosophical and theistic basis from Vishishtadvaita. A large number of devotional Vaishnavism traditions of east India, north India (particularly the Braj region), west and central India are based on various sub-schools of Bhedabheda Vedanta. Advaita Vedanta influenced Krishna Vaishnavism in the northeastern state of Assam. The Madhva school of Vaishnavism found in coastal Karnataka is based on Dvaita Vedanta.

Āgamas, the classical literature of Shaivism, though independent in origin, show Vedanta association and premises. Of the 92 Āgamas, ten are (dvaita) texts, eighteen (bhedabheda), and sixty-four (advaita) texts. While the Bhairava Shastras are monistic, Shiva Shastras are dualistic.  finds the link between Gaudapada's Advaita Vedanta and Kashmir Shaivism evident and natural. Tirumular, the Tamil Shaiva Siddhanta scholar, credited with creating "Vedanta–Siddhanta" (Advaita Vedanta and Shaiva Siddhanta synthesis), stated, "becoming Shiva is the goal of Vedanta and Siddhanta; all other goals are secondary to it and are vain."

Shaktism, or traditions where a goddess is considered identical to Brahman, has similarly flowered from a syncretism of the monist premises of Advaita Vedanta and dualism premises of Samkhya–Yoga school of Hindu philosophy, sometimes referred to as Shaktadavaitavada (literally, the path of nondualistic Shakti).

Influence on Western thinkers 
An exchange of ideas has been taking place between the western world and Asia since the late 18th century as a result of colonization of parts of Asia by Western powers. This also influenced western religiosity. The first translation of Upanishads, published in two parts in 1801 and 1802, significantly influenced Arthur Schopenhauer, who called them the consolation of his life. He drew explicit parallels between his philosophy, as set out in The World as Will and Representation, and that of the Vedanta philosophy as described in the work of Sir William Jones. Early translations also appeared in other European languages. Influenced by Śaṅkara's concepts of Brahman (God) and māyā (illusion), Lucian Blaga often used the concepts marele anonim (the Great Anonymous) and cenzura transcendentă (the transcendental censorship) in his philosophy.

Similarities with Spinoza's philosophy
German Sanskritist Theodore Goldstücker was among the early scholars to notice similarities between the religious conceptions of the Vedanta and those of the Dutch Jewish philosopher Baruch Spinoza, writing that Spinoza's thought was

Max Müller noted the striking similarities between Vedanta and the system of Spinoza, saying,

Helena Blavatsky, a founder of the Theosophical Society, also compared Spinoza's religious thought to Vedanta, writing in an unfinished essay,

See also
 Badarayana
 Monistic idealism
 List of teachers of Vedanta
 Self-consciousness (Vedanta)
 Śāstra pramāṇam in Hinduism

Notes

References

Sources

Printed sources

 
 

 
 
 
 
 
 
 
 
 
 
 
 

 
 
 
 
 
 
 
 
 
 
 
 

 
 
 
 
 
 
 
 
 

 

 
 

 
 
 
 
 
 
 
 
 
 
 

 
 
 —OR—

 
 
 
 .

 
 
 
 
 
 

 
 
 
 
 
 
 

 
 
 

 
 
 
 
 
 
 
 
 
 
 

 
 
  ,

Web sources

Further reading
 
 
 
 
Comparative analysis of commentaries on Vedanta Sutras. https://archive.org/download/in.ernet.dli.2015.283844/2015.283844.The-Vedanta.pdf
 
 
 
  - Resources to help with the Study and Practice of Vedanta.

External links

 
Āstika
Consciousness
Dualism in cosmology
Hindu philosophical concepts
Metaphilosophy
Schools and traditions in ancient Indian philosophy
Nondualism
Philosophical schools and traditions
Vedas